Richard Alvarez (born October 30, 1980) is a Japanese-born Filipino professional basketball coach and former player. He played his whole career in the Philippine Basketball Association (PBA). He was the first overall pick of 2004 PBA draft by the Shell Turbo Chargers. He last served as an assistant coach for the Rain or Shine Elasto Painters of the PBA.

Early life and college career
Alvarez grew up in Yokosuka, Japan where he first played for the Nile C. Kinnick High School Basketball Varsity Squad. Shortly, after finishing high school, he flew to the Philippines and attended at Ateneo de Manila University where he became a pivotal part of the Blue Eagles basketball squad. At Ateneo, he was known for his tenacity and hustle plays. Thus, as a sophomore in 2000, he won the coveted UAAP MVP award, beating the likes of King Archer Mike Cortez, fellow Blue Eagle Enrico Villanueva and UST's Cyrus Baguio.

The following year in 2001, he won his second UAAP MVP plum. However, the team still failed to win the championship as the Green Archers established their dynasty in the collegiate ranks courtesy of winning their fourth-straight UAAP championship.

Finally, in 2002, with a stellar supporting cast composed of LA Tenorio, Larry Fonacier, Wesley Gonzales and Gec Chia, he anchored the Blue Eagles to win the title against the heavily favored Green Archers, their first title since 1988.

While in the amateur ranks, he also played for several teams in the Philippine Basketball League, such as Hapee-Nenaco/FASH and Pioneer Insurance. He was also a member of the Philippine national team that competed in the 2003 SEA Games.

PBA career
Alvarez was drafted first overall by Shell Turbo Chargers in the 2004 PBA Draft, ahead of former college rival James Yap. He played his first PBA game on the team's second game after former coach John Moran benched him in the first game. He thought that Alvarez was not yet ready to play, but when Leo Austria took over the team's coaching duties, his game status went up and won the Rookie of the Year honors at season's end. In his rookie season, he averaged 8.8 points and 6.4 rebounds in 72 games.

As the Shell franchise was about to take a leave of absence from the league, he was traded to the Alaska Aces along with Tony dela Cruz, where he struggled in his only appearance with the team during the 2005-06 PBA Fiesta Conference. Prior to the start of the 2006 PBA Philippine Cup, he was traded to the Red Bull Barako in exchange for two 1st round picks, reuniting him with some of his former teammates in college.

In 2008, he was traded again, this time to Purefoods in exchange for Barako's 2011 first-round pick.

The following year, he was involved into a blockbuster multi-player deal that sent him to the Ginebra Kings.

In 2010, he was traded again, along with Doug Kramer, to Air21 in exchange for Yancy de Ocampo.

As his contract with Air21 expired, he signed with Talk 'N Text prior to start of the 2010–11 PBA season. Initially, he was only signed to a one-conference contract. However, with his valuable contributions off the bench, he stayed with the Tropang Texters until the 2012–13 PBA season. In his last year with the team, he only averaged career-low numbers of 0.4 point, 1.1 rebounds and 0.2 assist in just 20 games.

Kia

After his stint with Talk 'N Text, he found himself without a team for the entire 2013–14 season. However, when the news broke out that three franchises KIA, Blackwater, and NLEX were accepted as expansion teams in the PBA, he immediately joined the tryouts of Team Kia, and he's out to prove he can still compete. His competitiveness and renewed fervor rewarded him of a spot at Kia Sorento for the upcoming 2014–15 PBA season.

Personal life

Alvarez began dating R&B singer, Kyla (real name Melanie Calumpad) in 2005. After six years of dating, he proposed in January 2011. Their wedding took place on November 28, 2011. Their son, Toby Elsiah, was born on May 5, 2013.

References

1980 births
Living people
Alaska Aces (PBA) players
Ateneo Blue Eagles men's basketball players
Barako Bull Energy players
Barako Bull Energy Boosters players
Barangay Ginebra San Miguel players
Competitors at the 2003 Southeast Asian Games
Filipino men's basketball coaches
Filipino men's basketball players
Magnolia Hotshots players
People from Yokosuka, Kanagawa
Philippines men's national basketball team players
Power forwards (basketball)
Rain or Shine Elasto Painters coaches
Shell Turbo Chargers draft picks
Shell Turbo Chargers players
Southeast Asian Games competitors for the Philippines
Southeast Asian Games gold medalists for the Philippines
Southeast Asian Games medalists in basketball
Terrafirma Dyip players
TNT Tropang Giga players